John Carroll (born November 8, 1955) is an American basketball coach, currently an assistant coach for the University of Rhode Island men's basketball team. He served as the head coach for the Boston Celtics of the National Basketball Association (NBA), during the latter part of the 2003–04 season, temporarily replacing Jim O'Brien, who had resigned.  At the end of the season he was replaced as head coach by Doc Rivers.

Playing career
A point guard at Summit High School in Summit, New Jersey, Carroll captained his senior team to the New Jersey state championship.  Carroll was a four-year starter at Dickinson College in Carlisle, Pennsylvania, where he earned a degree in psychology in 1977.

Coaching career
Carroll was the head basketball coach at Bloomfield College in Bloomfield, New Jersey from 1979 to 1982. The Deacons were 42–38 under Carroll and advanced to the NAIA District Finals twice in three seasons. He went on to become an assistant coach at Seton Hall University under P. J. Carlesimo for seven seasons before becoming the head basketball coach for Duquesne University from 1989 to 1995.  He compiled a 73–98 career record with one winning season, in 1993–94, when the Dukes went 17–13 overall and 8–8 in the Atlantic 10 Conference.  They earned a trip to the National Invitation Tournament (NIT), where they beat UNC Charlotte in the first round but lost to Villanova in second round.  Carroll was the Atlantic 10 Coach of the Year for the 1990–91 season after leading the Dukes to a 10–8 conference record.

Carroll now coaches for the New England Playaz AAU program.

Head coaching record

|-
| style="text-align:left;"|Boston
| style="text-align:left;"|
|36||14||22|||| align="center"|4th in Atlantic|||4||0||4|| .000
| style="text-align:center;"|Lost in First Round
|- class="sortbottom"
| style="text-align:left;"|Career
| ||36||14||22|||| ||4||0||4||.000||

References

External links
 John Carroll profile @ NBA.com

1955 births
Living people
Basketball coaches from New Jersey
Basketball players from New Jersey
Boston Celtics head coaches
Dickinson Red Devils men's basketball players
Duquesne Dukes men's basketball coaches
Sportspeople from Summit, New Jersey
Point guards
Seton Hall Pirates men's basketball coaches
American men's basketball players